Ansaruddin Abdul Malik "Hooky" Alonto Adiong is a Filipino politician serving as the representative of Lanao del Sur's 1st district since 2013. He was elected vice governor of the Autonomous Region in Muslim Mindanao (ARMM) in 2005. After Governor Zaldy Ampatuan's removal from office in 2009, Adiong became the acting governor until 2011.

A member of the Alonto political family of Lanao del Sur, Ansaruddin is a son of Mamintal M. Adiong Sr. and brother to Mamintal Alonto Adiong Jr.

Political career

Acting Governor
Department of Interior and Local Government (DILG) Secretary Ronaldo Puno swore in Adiong as acting governor of the ARMM in December 2009.  As Vice Governor, Adiong moved up to replace Zaldy Ampatuan, who was taken into military custody for his alleged involvement in the November 2009 massacre of 57 civilians in Maguindanao.

Congress
Adiong was elected to the House of Representatives in the 2013 elections. He was reelected in 2016 and 2019.

On May 11, 2017, Adiong, along with five other Liberal Party congressmen, transferred to PDP–Laban. In the 2019 elections, Adiong ran under the Nacionalista Party.

Adiong was elected chairman of the House Committee on Muslim Affairs of the 18th Congress.

References

Living people
Governors of the Autonomous Region in Muslim Mindanao
Members of the House of Representatives of the Philippines from Lanao del Sur
Lakas–CMD politicians
People from Lanao del Sur
Filipino Muslims
Year of birth missing (living people)